Geleshan is a subdistrict in the Shapingba District of Chongqing, China. It is located 13.6 km west of Chongqing city centre.

Demographics
As of 2010, Geleshan has a recorded population of 41,674. The population consists of 21,045 females and 20,629 males. Children under 15 comprise 8.0%, persons 15–64 years old comprise 83%, and 65 years old or over 8.0%.

Culture
The famous spicy chicken dish Laziji (辣子鸡) is thought to originate from Geleshan.

Education
The Chongqing Communications Institute is a college located in the Geleshan Subdistrict.

Other notable institutions in Geleshan include the Chongqing Business Career Academy, Chongqing Zhengda Software Vocational college, and the Technical Institute Tianchi Campus.

Tourism
Geleshan is perhaps best known for its forest park, the Geleshan National Forest Park, which is a nationally protected area.

Geography
The terrain around Geleshan is hilly to the southwest, with a flat northeastern area. 
The highest point of the area is 647 m above sea level, situated in the southeastern area. The neighbourhoods around Geleshan consists mainly of farmland.

Climate
Much of Geleshan lies in the humid subtropical climate zone (Köppen climate classification Cfa), featuring warm humid summers and generally mild winters with cool spells. 
The average rainfall is 1114 mm.

See also
 Geleshan National Forest Park
 Shapingba District
 Chongqing

References

Towns in Chongqing